Eduardo Fernández (born 1952) is a Uruguayan classical guitarist, teacher and arranger-composer. He received prizes in the 1972 Porto Alegre and 1975 Radio France competitions, won the Premio Andrés Segovia in 1975 and debuted in New York in 1977. After his 1983 London debut, Fernández was signed by Decca Records. His textbook has been published in English as Technique, Mechanism, Learning (2002).

Selected discography
 Bach, J.S.: Lute Suites (2 CDs) 1989 Decca Music Group Limited
 Guitar Concerti Manuel Ponce, Heitor Villa-Lobos, Jaurés Lamarque Pons. ECO, conducted Enrique García Asensio. Decca 1990
 The World of The Spanish Guitar Decca compilation 1992 
 Avant-garde guitar. Takemitsu: All in Twilight. Leo Brouwer: La espiral eterna. Britten: Nocturnal after John Dowland. Berio: Sequenza XI. Decca

References

Articles
 Interview (1984), by Paul Magnussen

External links
 60 Birthday Tribute Concert (Spanish)

Uruguayan classical guitarists
1952 births
Living people